Elisabeth Anne de Vries (born 28 June 1990) is a Dutch midfielder, who plays for Urædd. She has played for SC Heerenveen, FC Utrecht and PEC Zwolle.

She has been a member of the Dutch national team, taking part in the 2009 European Championship.

International goals
Scores and results list the Netherlands goal tally first.

References

External links
 

1990 births
Living people
Sportspeople from Amstelveen
Dutch women's footballers
Netherlands women's international footballers
Eredivisie (women) players
PEC Zwolle (women) players
FC Utrecht (women) players
SC Heerenveen (women) players
Women's association football midfielders
Dutch expatriate women's footballers
Footballers from North Holland